Tussy may refer to:

 Eleanor Marx, socialist and writer, daughter of Karl Marx, nicknamed "Tussy"
 Tussy, Oklahoma, USA, an unincorporated community